Whitaker's is a reference book, published annually in the United Kingdom. It was originally published by J Whitaker & Sons from 1868 to 1997, next by The Stationery Office until 2003 and then by A & C Black, which became a wholly owned subsidiary of Bloomsbury Publishing in 2011. The publication was acquired by Rebellion Publishing in 2020, with the 153rd edition appearing on 15 April 2021. In mid-2022, Rebellion announced that there would not be a 2022 edition.

First publication
Joseph Whitaker began preparing his Almanack in the autumn of 1868. He postponed publication of the first edition on learning of the resignation of Benjamin Disraeli on 1 December 1868, so that he could include details of the new Gladstone administration. At the same time, Whitaker continued to expand the information so that the initially planned 329 pages grew to 370. The first edition of the Almanack appeared on 23 December 1868, priced at 1 shilling, introduced by a short editorial piece written by Joseph Whitaker. It began "The Editor does not put forward this Almanack as perfect: yet he ventures to think that he has succeeded in preparing a work which will commend itself to those who desire to see improvement in this direction." It concluded by inviting critics to suggest ways in which improvements could be made.

The Manchester Guardian, reviewing the first edition, described it as "the largest of the cheap almanacks" to appear, and noted it contained a great deal more valuable information than other such works. In 2013, the 2014 edition became the first to be published under the new simpler branding of "Whitaker's".

Content
Whitaker's Almanack consists of articles, lists and tables on a wide range of subjects including education, the peerage, government departments, health and social issues, and the environment.

The largest section is the countries directory, which includes recent history, politics, economic information and culture overviews. Each edition also features a selection of critical essays focusing on events of the previous year. Extensive astronomical data covering the forthcoming year is published at the rear of the book.

Whitaker's was prized enough that Winston Churchill took a personal interest in the continued publication of the book after its headquarters were destroyed in the Blitz. A copy is also sealed in Cleopatra's Needle on the north bank of the River Thames.

Formats
Each year the Almanack is published in two formats – the Standard Edition and a shortened Concise Edition. In previous years, a larger-format of the Standard Edition, bound in leather, was produced for libraries. In 2016, Whitaker's launched its online edition through its website, which was updated weekly with free-to-view and subscription only content.

Editors
The Almanack'''s current editor is Michael Rowley.

Editors since 1868
There have been eleven editors since 1868:

 Joseph Whitaker 1868–1895
 Sir Cuthbert Whitaker 1895–1950
 F. H. C. Tatham 1950–1981
 Richard Blake 1981–1986
 Hilary Marsden 1986–1999
 Lauren Simpson 1999–2004
 Vanessa White 2001–2002
 Inna Ward 2004–2008
 Claire Fogg 2008–2010
 Ruth Northey 2010–2020
 Michael Rowley 2020–

Alternative publicationsThe World Almanac and Book of FactsThe World FactbookTIME Almanac with Information PleaseThe New York Times AlmanacDer Fischer WeltalmanachEuropa World Year BookIn popular cultureWhitaker's Almanack provides the key to a book cipher message at the beginning of Arthur Conan Doyle's 1915 Sherlock Holmes novel The Valley of Fear.  Lt. Cmdr. Data refers to the Almanack in his Holodeck portrayal of Holmes in the Star Trek: The Next Generation episode "Elementary, Dear Data."Whitaker's Almanack is mentioned in chapter 2 of Bram Stoker's Dracula, with a copy being owned by the Count.
It is also mentioned in Virginia Woolf's short story "The Mark on the Wall", the James Bond novel Moonraker and Evelyn Waugh's Vile Bodies.
In "The Round Dozen", a short story by W. Somerset Maugham, a character recalls being advised by a famous novelist that the two most useful books for a writer are the Bible and Whitaker's Almanack''.

References

External links

 Whitaker's Almanack archives at Online Books Page, University of Pennsylvania

Almanacs
Publications established in 1868
1868 establishments in the United Kingdom
British books
Bloomsbury Publishing books
Whitaker family
Publications disestablished in 2021